Word of the Day may refer to:
"Word of the Day" (Rugrats), an episode of Rugrats
The Wiktionary Word of the day

See also
Spanish Word of the Day, a Sesame Street recurring segment
Word of the year, the most important word(s) or expression(s) in the public sphere during a specific year